Matthias Mangertseder (born 24 November 1998) is a German racing cyclist, who currently rides for UCI Continental team .

References

External links
 

1998 births
Living people
German male cyclists
Place of birth missing (living people)
People from Rottal-Inn
Sportspeople from Lower Bavaria
Cyclists from Bavaria